Prince Edward School (or Prince Edward, commonly referred to as PE) is a public, boarding and day school for boys aged 13 to 19 in Harare, Zimbabwe. It provides education facilities to 1200+ boys in Forms I to VI. The school is served by a graduate staff of over 100 teachers.

Prince Edward School was ranked 6th out of the top 100 best high schools in Africa by Africa Almanac in 2003, based upon quality of education, student engagement, strength and activities of alumni, school profile, internet and news visibility. Prince Edward School was also ranked as one of the Top 10 High Schools in Zimbabwe in 2014.

History 
Prince Edward was established in 1898 in Salisbury, Southern Rhodesia (now Harare, Zimbabwe), as Salisbury Grammar. It was renamed Salisbury High School in 1906 and adopted its current name in 1925 when visited by Edward, Prince of Wales. It is the second oldest boys' school in Harare and in Zimbabwe after its main sporting rival, St George's College.

The School's badge is a crown and three feathers, granted to it by Prince Edward (later King Edward VIII of the UK) in the 1920s. The school's colours are maroon and dark green. For its centenary, Prince Edward School adopted a new coat of arms which does not replace the school's badge. The motto of the school "Tot Facienda Parum Factum" ("So much to do, So little done") is attributed as Cecil John Rhodes' last words.

In 2010 a former master at the school, Douglas Robb, became headmaster of Oswestry School in England and developed links between the two schools.

Name controversy 
In 2002, before the March 2002 presidential elections, the Ministry of Education announced plans to change names of all government schools that had colonial connotations. Scores of government schools were set to have their names changed to honour liberation war heroes, past national and African personalities and/or the suburban area in which the school is located. Prince Edward School was set to be renamed Murenga Boys High School after a Njelele high spirit said to have assisted the local heroes who fought the First Chimurenga of 1896–7. The change of names did not occur but in its wake, as a compromise, the Games Houses within the school had their colonial names changed to those of rivers in Zimbabwe.

Alumni 
Prince Edward old boys are called "Old Hararians". The Old Hararians Association was founded in 1922 and maintains very close ties with the school.

The Old Hararians cricket team is based the Old Hararians Sports Club in Harare, and fields a team in the Vigne Cup, the Harare Metropolitan Cricket League, as well as the National League for club cricket. Old Hararians contain many national team and "A" team, such as Vusi Sibanda, Prosper Utseya and Ryan Butterworth.

Notable alumni

 Allan Anderson - Pentecostal minister and theologian
 Miles Anderson – actor
 Kevin Arnott – cricketer
 Sir Hugh Beadle –  lawyer, politician and judge
 Eddo Brandes – cricketer
 John Bredenkamp – rugby player and businessman  
 Ryan Butterworth – cricketer
 Tonderai Chavanga – rugby union player
 Graeme Cremer – cricketer
 Colin Dowdeswell – tennis player
 Jackie du Preez – cricketer
 Duncan Fletcher – cricketer
 Robert Gwaze – chess player
 Graeme Hick – cricketer
 David Houghton – cricketer
 Tino Kadewere - footballer
 Sam Levy – businessman and property developer
 Rodwell Makoto – chess player
 James Manyika – consultant, academic, Rhodes Scholar
Evan Mawarire – pastor and democratic activist
 Barry May – cricketer and Rhodes Scholar
 Peter McLaughlin – academic, historian, and educator
 Mark McNulty – golfer
 John McPhun – cricketer
 Leonard Ray Morgan – educationalist
 Lucian Msamati – actor
 David Mutendera – cricketer
 Faustine Ndugulile – politician and Tanzanian member of parliament
 Trevor Penney – cricketer
 John Plagis – pilot
 David E. Potter – businessman and engineer
 Nick Price – golfer
 Ian Robertson – Springbok rugby player
 Douglas Rogers – writer
 Herbert Schwamborn – musician
 Colin Smith – rower
 Alexander Steele – Scottish architect and cricketer
 Edmoore Takaendesa – rugby player
 Wrex Tarr – comedian and archer
 Russell Tiffin – cricket umpire
 Denis Tomlinson – cricketer
 Sir Robert Tredgold, K.C.M.G., judge, politician and Rhodes Scholar
 Kennedy Tsimba – rugby player
 Mark Vermeulen – cricketer

See also 

 List of schools in Zimbabwe
 List of boarding schools

References

External links 
Prince Edward School website
Old Hararians website

Schools in Harare
Educational institutions established in 1898
Boys' schools in Zimbabwe
Boys' high schools in Zimbabwe
Boarding schools in Zimbabwe
Day schools in Zimbabwe
High schools in Zimbabwe
1898 establishments in the British Empire